An early indirect presidential election was held in Hungary on 2 May 2012, following the resignation of Pál Schmitt as President of Hungary on 2 April 2012. János Áder was elected president with an absolute majority.

Background
Pál Schmitt was elected head of state of Hungary in summer 2010, following the 2010 Hungarian parliamentary election in which Fidesz came out with an absolute majority of seats and PM Viktor Orbán nominated him.

As a result of an allegation of academic misconduct he was stripped by a legal session of the Senate of the SOTE of his doctorate degree on 29 March. On 2 April, Schmitt told Parliament he would resign as President saying that "under the Constitution, the President must represent the unity of the Hungarian nation. I have unfortunately become a symbol of division; I feel it is my duty to leave my position." Speaker of the National Assembly László Kövér then took over as acting president according to the Constitution of Hungary, which also mandates the National Assembly has 30 days to elect a new president. One of the five Deputy Speakers of the Parliament, Sándor Lezsák, was commissioned with exercising the Speaker's rights and responsibilities in the interim period.

Candidates
The Hungarian Socialist Party (MSZP), Politics Can Be Different (LMP) and the Democratic Coalition (DK) agreed about the opposition parties' guarantees for having a meaningful say in the presidential election. The Socialist Party also submitted a bill to mandate a four-fifths majority in order to elect a new head of state instead of the current two-thirds majority so as to stymie Fidesz-KDNP's ability to unilaterally elect a new president without the opposition.

Jobbik nominated MEP Krisztina Morvai and former Minister of Defence Lajos Für as the party's candidates to the presidential position on 4 April. However, Für later announced that he would not accept the nomination.

Fidesz announced that will nominate MEP János Áder. Áder was criticised for his close relationship with Prime Minister Viktor Orbán on the grounds that he would not serve as a check on the power of the Prime Minister.

Results
MSZP boycotted the vote because they said the move would strengthen the hand of the ruling party who have already appointed allies to the judiciary and in the media. LMP and the Democratic Coalition also joined the boycott. LMP's Benedek Jávor said their decision was based on taking a stand against the procedure of Áder's nominated as, following Schmitt's resignation, there was a trust deficit in democratic institutions and a consensus should have been made on a non-partisan candidate.

Áder took the oath of office immediately and was congratulated by Prime Minister Viktor Orbán, Parliamentary Speaker László Kövér, Deputy Prime Minister Zsolt Semjén and the four parliamentary group leaders; he then met with his predecessor Pál Schmitt, former Prime Ministers Péter Boross and Péter Medgyessy and the President of the Hungarian Academy of Sciences József Pálinkás.

Reactions
After the vote, Áder said that he would "avail himself fully of both his constitutional rights and obligations" and that he "say[s] to the people of the neighbouring countries, and to our allies in the European Union and NATO, we offer them friendship and respect - which also means that we expect the same respect and friendship back". He also added that the new Constitution, which he helped draft, "provides from all aspects an adequate direction and framework to find the right solutions to the fundamental issues and challenges of the 21st century... Let me reach out to believers and to non-believers alike, and ask them to see in each other what unites us, as understanding one another will enrich us all". Prime Minister Viktor Orbán added that the best decision for "setting in motion and stabilising" the constitution was made as Áder was an "anchor". "We know the President, we respect him and think highly of him". Jobbik's deputy leader Zoltán Balczó said that Áder should be above "party identity" and that the party had hoped "national cooperation", as announced by Fidesz-KDNP, meant a non-partisan candidate should have been chosen. For its part, the Democratic Coalition's Ágnes Vadai said that Áder was not trustworthy enough to safeguard the democratic nature of the state. LMP's Benedek Jávor also said that Áder should start a constitutional review of electoral and justice laws.

Academic reactions to the result included Attila Juhász, of the think tank Political Capital, who said: "You should not expect Áder to become a power check and resist the Prime Minister, that's not what you can read from his career. It's also important that the president elected now will be in office until 2017, and the office will be held by someone from the innermost circles of Fidesz even if the party loses the 2014 parliamentary elections". Ferenc Kumin of the Századvég Foundation, said that Áder was presented as representative of the plurality of groups within the country in opposition to the criticism levelled against him of his closeness to the "political right" and that his first speech to Parliament was "convincing proof" of his readiness for the "high position and the magnitude of his job with due humility". Gábor Filippov of the Hungarian Progressive Institute said that Áder will be to show that he is not bound by his previous Fidesz-associations as he took the duties of President from a non-partisan approach.

References

2012
2012 elections in Europe
2012 in Hungary